Ronald Edgar Giphart (born 17 December 1965, in Dordrecht) is a Dutch writer. His best known books, Ik ook van jou (1992), Phileine zegt sorry (1996) and Ik omhels je met 1000 armen (2000), all have been filmed. His 2012 book, Het Leven, De Liefde En De Lusten, was published in English as Living, Loving, Longing.

Awards
 1993 - Gouden Ezelsoor for Ik ook van jou
 2004 -  for all his writing

References

External links 
 Ronald Giphart at Leesplein 

1965 births
Living people
People from Dordrecht
Dutch male writers